Sir Richard Rashleigh Folliott Scott, Baron Scott of Foscote,  (born 2 October 1934) is a British judge, who formerly held the office of Lord of Appeal in Ordinary.

Early life

The son of Lieutenant-Colonel C. W. F. and Katharine Scott, Scott was born on 2 October 1934 and educated at Michaelhouse School, Natal in South Africa. He then studied at the University of Cape Town, where he received a Bachelor of Arts degree in 1954, and Trinity College, Cambridge, where he received a B.A (Law Tripos) in 1957 and a Blue in rugby. He then spent a year as Bigelow Fellow at the University of Chicago, where he met his future wife, Rima Elisa Ripoll, who is from Panama.

Legal career

Scott was called to the bar by the Inner Temple in 1959, becoming a Bencher in 1981. From 1960 to 1983, he practised at the Chancery Bar, and was appointed a Queen's Counsel in 1975. In 1980, Scott was appointed Attorney-General of the Duchy of Lancaster, a post he held until 1983. He was Vice-Chairman of the Bar from 1981 to 1982, and chairman from 1982 to 1983.

Scott was appointed a judge of the High Court of Justice in 1983, sitting in the Chancery Division, and received the customary knighthood. From 1987 to 1991, he held the office of Vice-Chancellor of the County Palatine of Lancaster, which has responsibility for overseeing Chancery business in the North of England. He was promoted to the Court of Appeal in 1991, becoming a Lord Justice of Appeal and receiving an appointment to the Privy Council, and serving as Vice-Chancellor, the head of the Chancery Division, from 1994 to 2000, and Head of Civil Justice from 1995 to 2000.

On 17 July 2000, he was appointed a Lord of Appeal in Ordinary and created a life peer as Baron Scott of Foscote, of Foscote in the County of Buckinghamshire. He retired from this post on 30 September 2009, and did not transfer along with the other Lords of Appeal of ordinary to the new Supreme Court of the United Kingdom. The vacancy on the bench his retirement created was filled by Lord Clarke of Stone-cum-Ebony, previously Master of the Rolls. He sat as a crossbencher until his retirement from the House of Lords on 21 December 2016.

In 2003, he was appointed a non-permanent member of Hong Kong's Court of Final Appeal, and while serving there, he is known by his Chinese name. He left the court in 2012.

Notable judicial decisions of Lord Scott included:
 Cumbrian Newspapers Group Ltd v Cumberland & Westmorland Herald Newspaper & Printing Co Ltd [1986] BCLC 286 - leading authority on class rights of shares

Scott Inquiry

In 1992, Scott, while a Lord Justice of Appeal, was appointed to chair an inquiry into the Arms-to-Iraq scandal, in which it was claimed the British government had supported British companies in selling defence equipment to Iraq. The report was published in 1996, although much of it was secret. In 2001, Scott said it was "regrettable and disappointing" the Government had not made changes to the law regulating the arms trade.

Personal life

Lord Scott has been married to Rima Elisa Ripoll since 1959. They have two sons and two daughters.

References

1934 births
Knights Bachelor
Alumni of Trinity College, Cambridge
Scott of Foscote 
British King's Counsel
Members of the Inner Temple
Members of the Privy Council of the United Kingdom
Alumni of Michaelhouse
20th-century King's Counsel
University of Cape Town alumni
Members of the Judicial Committee of the Privy Council
Living people
Justices of the Court of Final Appeal (Hong Kong)
Hong Kong judges
South African emigrants to the United Kingdom
Attorneys-General of the Duchy of Lancaster
Crossbench life peers
Judges of the Supreme Court of the United Kingdom
Chancery Division judges